The Chilean highway Route 9 (9-CH) runs from the Brunswick Peninsula south of Punta Arenas north to Paso Baguales Oriental at the border with Argentina in Torres del Paine commune. Route 9-CH is the main highway of Magallanes y la Antártica Chilena Region, and to travel between Route 9-CH and Chilean highways north of Magallanes y la Antártica Chilena Region vehicles have to pass through Argentina.

During the White Earthquake of 1995 a number of cars and two buses with passengers were trapped in the snow along the route.

Places along the highway
 Punta Arenas
 Villa Tehuelches
 Puerto Natales
 Cerro Castillo

References

Roads in Chile
Transport in Magallanes Region